Reginald Edward Hounsfield (14 August 1882–1939) was an English footballer who played in the Football League for Derby County  and The Wednesday.

References

1882 births
1939 deaths
English footballers
Association football forwards
English Football League players
Sheffield F.C. players
Sheffield Wednesday F.C. players
Derby County F.C. players